Tarbert is the main community on Harris in the Western Isles of Scotland. The name means "isthmus", "crossing point" or "portage", in Gaelic. The isthmus, between the sea lochs West Loch Tarbert and East Loch Tarbert, joins south Harris to north Harris and Lewis. In 1981 it had a population of 503.

Tarbert's Church of Scotland parish church was built in 1862, and is within the parish of Harris. Tarbert also has a Free Presbyterian church. The Very Rev Mackintosh MacKay was minister of the latter in the 1860s.

Transport
Tarbert has a car ferry terminal which operates to Uig on Skye. The short A868 joins the terminal to the north–south A859 road.

Economy
The Harris distillery, a Scotch whisky and Gin distillery is located in Tarbert.

References

External links

Canmore - Harris, Tarbert, General site record
Canmore - Cnoc Na Greine, Tarbert, Harris, site record

Villages in Harris, Outer Hebrides